Peter Adam Bullough (1865–1933) was an English footballer who played in the Football League for Bolton Wanderers.

Peter Bullough made his League debut on 8 September 1888 at Pike's Lane, then home of Bolton Wanderers, against Derby County. Bolton Wanderers lost the match 6–3. He scored his debut League goal on 17 November 1888 at Pike's Lane against West Bromwich Albion in a 2–1 defeat. He played 15 of the 22 League games played by Bolton Wanderers in the 1888–89 Football League season and scored once.

References

1865 births
1933 deaths
Footballers from Bolton
English footballers
Association football wing halves
Bolton Wanderers F.C. players
English Football League players